Aïn Sebaâ  is an arrondissement of eastern Casablanca, in the Aïn Sebaâ - Hay Mohammadi district of the Casablanca-Settat region of Morocco. As of 2004 it had 155,489 inhabitants. An area on the road to Mohammédia, many major industrial conglomerates of Morocco are based here. 2M TV's headquarters can be found here.

Education

The Groupe Scolaire Louis Massignon, a French international school, maintains its Aïn Sebaâ primary campus and its collège-lycée (junior and senior high school) in Aïn Sebaâ.

Notable residents
Abdelhak Aatakni - Olympic boxer

References

Arrondissements of Casablanca
Neighbourhoods of Casablanca